The Betway T20 Challenge is a domestic Twenty20 Cricket competition in South Africa, first contested in the 2003–04 season. It was previously known as the Standard Bank Pro20 Series until the 2010–11 season, the MiWay T20 Challenge for the 2011–12 season and most recently as the RamSlam T20 Challenge. The current champions are the Imperial Lions, whilst the Titans have been the most successful with 6 title wins.

The tournament has been contested since its inception by the six franchise teams but for the 2007–08 season, Zimbabwe took part as a seventh side. In April 2019, Cricket South Africa announced that the 2018–19 tournament would be the final edition of the T20 Challenge, due to austerity measures and a restructure of domestic cricket in the country. The competition was effectively replaced as a top cricket league with a franchise-based T20 tournament, the Mzansi Super League, which had its first edition in 2018.

The tournament was however played during February 2021, with all the matches taking place at the Kingsmead Cricket Ground in Durban. It replaced the 2020 edition of the Mzansi Super League, which was cancelled due to the COVID-19 pandemic.

Teams

Former participants
Zimbabwe (2007–08 season)
Impi (2011–12 season)

Tournament results

Notes
Starting with the 2008–09 season until the 2013–14 season, the winning and runner-up teams would qualify for the Champions League Twenty20.

References

External links
 Cricket South Africa.

South African domestic cricket competitions
Twenty20 cricket leagues
Professional cricket leagues